The 1999 Formula Nippon Championship was  contested over 10 rounds. 14 different teams, 26 different drivers, 3 different chassis and only 1 engine competed.

Teams and drivers

Calendar

Championship standings

Drivers' Championship
Scoring system

Teams' Championship

External links
1999 Japanese Championship Formula Nippon

Formula Nippon
Super Formula
Nippon